Pravovostochnoye is a rural locality (a selo) and the administrative center of Pravovostochny Selsoviet of Ivanovsky District, Amur Oblast, Russia. The population was 302 as of 2018. There are 8 streets.

Geography 
Pravovostochnoye is located on the right bank of the Manchzhurka River, 16 km east of Ivanovka (the district's administrative centre) by road. Sadovoye is the nearest rural locality.

References 

Rural localities in Ivanovsky District, Amur Oblast